Crossing to Safety is a 1987 semi-autobiographical novel by "The Dean of Western Writers", Wallace Stegner.  It gained broad literary acclaim and commercial popularity.

In Crossing to Safety, Stegner explores the mysteries of friendship, and it extends Stegner's distinguished body of work that had already earned him a Pulitzer Prize (for 1971's Angle of Repose) and the National Book Award (for 1976's The Spectator Bird).  Publishers Weekly described the novel as "an eloquent, wise and immensely moving narrative," and "a meditation on the idealism and spirit of youth, when the world is full of promise, and on the blows and compromises life inevitably inflicts." The story is told mostly in flashback; the narrator, Larry Morgan, and his wife, Sally, settle into their new home in Madison, Wisconsin, as Larry begins a term teaching creative writing at the university's English department. They soon befriend another couple, Sid and Charity Lang, and learn of Sid's ambition to succeed as a writer. As their careers mature, they take different paths, but they spend much of their time together on summer vacations in the small Vermont town where Charity's family has been coming for decades.

Stegner's powerful but unassuming narrative traces the bond that develops between the Langs and the Morgans from their first meeting in 1937 through their eventual separation on the occasion of Charity's death from cancer.

References

1987 American novels
American autobiographical novels
Novels set in Madison, Wisconsin